The Republic of Flappers (German: Die Republik der Backfische) is a 1928 German silent comedy film directed by Constantin J. David and starring Käthe von Nagy, Raimondo Van Riel and Ernst Stahl-Nachbaur. The title refers to flappers.

Cast

References

Bibliography
  Eickhoff, Stefan. Max Schreck: Gespenstertheater. Belleville, 2009.

External links

1926 films
Films of the Weimar Republic
German silent feature films
German comedy films
Films directed by Constantin J. David
German black-and-white films
1926 comedy films
Flappers
Silent comedy films
1920s German films